Garcinia is a large genus of flowering plants in the family Clusiaceae. , there are nearly 400 accepted species:

A
 Garcinia acutifolia N.Robson
 Garcinia adinantha A.C.Sm. & S.P.Darwin
 Garcinia afzelii Engl.
 Garcinia amabilis Kaneh. & Hatus.
 Garcinia amboinensis Spreng.
 Garcinia ambrensis (H.Perrier) P.W.Sweeney & Z.S.Rogers
 Garcinia amplexicaulis Vieill. ex Pierre
 Garcinia andamanica King
 Garcinia angustifolia A.C.Sm.
 Garcinia anjouanensis (H.Perrier) P.W.Sweeney & Z.S.Rogers
 Garcinia anomala Planch. & Triana
 Garcinia apetala Pierre
 Garcinia aphanophlebia Baker
 Garcinia archboldiana A.C.Sm.
 Garcinia arenicola (Jum. & H.Perrier) P.W.Sweeney &
 Garcinia aristata (Griseb.) Borhidi
 Garcinia assamica J.Sarma, Shameer & N.Mohanan
 Garcinia assugu Lauterb.
 Garcinia asterandra Jum. & H.Perrier
 Garcinia atroviridis Griff. ex T.Anderson
 Garcinia australis Montrouz.

B
 Garcinia bakeriana (Urb.) Borhidi
 Garcinia balansae Pierre
 Garcinia balica Miq.
 Garcinia balimensis A.C.Sm.
 Garcinia bancana Miq.
 Garcinia barkeriana (Urb. & Ekman) Alain
 Garcinia beccarii Pierre
 Garcinia benthamiana (Planch. & Triana) Pipoly
 Garcinia bicolorata Elmer
 Garcinia bifasciculata N.Robson
 Garcinia binnendijkii Pierre
 Garcinia binucao (Blanco) Choisy
 Garcinia blumei Pierre
 Garcinia boerlagii Pierre
 Garcinia bokorensis H.Toyama & Yahara
 Garcinia bonii Pit.
 Garcinia borneensis Pierre
 Garcinia branderhorstii Lauterb.
 Garcinia brasiliensis Mart.
 Garcinia brassii C.T.White
 Garcinia brevipes Pierre
 Garcinia brevirostris Scheff.
 Garcinia buchananii Baker
 Garcinia buchneri Engl.
 Garcinia burkillii Whitmore
 Garcinia busuangaensis Merr.

C
 Garcinia cadelliana King
 Garcinia calcicola (Jum. & H.Perrier) P.W.Sweeney &
 Garcinia caloneura Boerl.
 Garcinia calophylla Pierre
 Garcinia calophyllifolia Ridl.
 Garcinia calycina Kurz
 Garcinia cambodgiensis Vesque
 Garcinia cantleyana Whitmore
 Garcinia capuronii Z.S.Rogers & P.W.Sweeney
 Garcinia carolinensis (Lauterb.) Kosterm.
 Garcinia cataractalis Whitmore
 Garcinia caudiculata Ridl.
 Garcinia celebica L.
 Garcinia ceramica Boerl.
 Garcinia cerasifera (H.Perrier) P.F.Stevens
 Garcinia chapelieri (Planch. & Triana) H.Perrier
 Garcinia choisyiana (Choisy) Wall. ex Planch. &
 Garcinia chromocarpa Engl.
 Garcinia cincta (Urb.) Borhidi
 Garcinia clarensis Borhidi
 Garcinia clusiifolia Ridl.
 Garcinia cochinchinensis (Lour.) Choisy
 Garcinia comptonii Baker f.
 Garcinia corallina Vieill.
 Garcinia cordata Merr.
 Garcinia corymbosa (Pancher & Sebert) Baker f.
 Garcinia costata Hemsl. ex King
 Garcinia cowa Roxb. ex Choisy
 Garcinia crassiflora Jum. & H.Perrier
 Garcinia crassifolia Seeth.
 Garcinia crassinervis (Warb.) Kosterm.
 Garcinia cubensis (Borhidi) Borhidi
 Garcinia cuneifolia Pierre
 Garcinia cuspidata King
 Garcinia cymosa (K.Schum.) I.M.Turner & P.F.Stevens

D
 Garcinia daedalanthera Pierre
 Garcinia dalleizettei (H.Perrier) P.W.Sweeney & Z.S.Rogers
 Garcinia dallmannensis Kaneh. & Hatus.
 Garcinia dauphinensis P.W.Sweeney & Z.S.Rogers
 Garcinia decipiens (Baill.) Vesque
 Garcinia decussata C.D.Adams
 Garcinia delpyana Pierre
 Garcinia densiflora Pierre
 Garcinia densivenia Engl.
 Garcinia desrousseauxii Pierre
 Garcinia dhanikhariensis S.K.Srivast.
 Garcinia dioica Blume
 Garcinia diospyrifolia Pierre
 Garcinia diversifolia King
 Garcinia dives Pierre
 Garcinia dryobalanoides Pierre
 Garcinia dulcis (Roxb.) Kurz
 Garcinia dumosa King

E
 Garcinia echinocarpa Thwaites
 Garcinia elliotii Engl.
 Garcinia elliptica (Graham) Wall. ex Wight
 Garcinia emarginata Lauterb.
 Garcinia engleriana A.C.Sm.
 Garcinia enthaematoeides Lauterb.
 Garcinia epunctata Stapf
 Garcinia erythrosperma Lauterb.
 Garcinia esculenta Y.H.Li
 Garcinia evonymoides (Planch. & Triana) P.W.Sweeney &

F
 Garcinia fagraeoides A.Chev.
 Garcinia floribunda Miq.
 Garcinia forbesii King
 Garcinia fruticosa Lauterb.
 Garcinia fusca Pierre
 Garcinia fuscopetiolata Lauterb.

G
 Garcinia gabonensis Sosef & Dauby
 Garcinia gamblei Shameer, T.Sabu & N.Mohanan
 Garcinia garciae Elmer
 Garcinia gardneriana (Planch. & Triana) Zappi
 Garcinia gaudichaudii Planch. & Triana
 Garcinia gerrardii Harv. ex Sim
 Garcinia gibbsiae S.Moore
 Garcinia gjellerupii Lauterb.
 Garcinia glaucescens Alain & M.M.Mejia
 Garcinia goudotiana (Planch. & Triana) P.W.Sweeney &
 Garcinia grahamii Pierre
 Garcinia graminea Kosterm.
 Garcinia grandifolia (Choisy) Pierre
 Garcinia griffithii T.Anderson
 Garcinia guacopary (S.Moore) M.Nee
 Garcinia gummi-gutta (L.) Roxb.

H
 Garcinia hainanensis Merr.
 Garcinia hanburyi Hook.f.
 Garcinia harmandii Pierre
 Garcinia hasskarlii Pierre
 Garcinia havilandii Stapf
 Garcinia hendersoniana Whitmore
 Garcinia hennecartii Pierre ex Schltr.
 Garcinia hermonii Kosterm.
 Garcinia hessii (Britton) Alain
 Garcinia heterandra Wall. ex Planch. & Triana
 Garcinia heterophylla Merr.
 Garcinia hollrungii Lauterb.
 Garcinia holttumii Ridl.
 Garcinia hopii H.Toyama & V.S.Dang
 Garcinia horsfieldiana Pierre
 Garcinia huillensis Welw.
 Garcinia humilis (Vahl) C.D.Adams
 Garcinia hunsteinii Lauterb.
 Garcinia hygrophila Lauterb.

I
 Garcinia idenburgensis A.C.Sm.
 Garcinia imbertii Bourd.
 Garcinia indica (Thouars) Choisy
 Garcinia intermedia (Pittier) Hammel
 Garcinia ituman Merr.

J
 Garcinia jaweri Lauterb.
 Garcinia jelinckii Kurz
 Garcinia jensenii W.E.Cooper

K
 Garcinia keenania Pierre
 Garcinia kingaensis Engl.
 Garcinia klabang Miq.
 Garcinia klinkii Lauterb.
 Garcinia klossii Ridl.
 Garcinia kola Heckel
 Garcinia korthalsii Pierre
 Garcinia kwangsiensis Merr. ex F.N.Wei
 Garcinia kydia Roxb.

L
 Garcinia lanceifolia Roxb.
 Garcinia lanceola Ridl.
 Garcinia lancilimba C.Y.Wu ex Y.H.Li
 Garcinia lanessanii Pierre
 Garcinia lateriflora Blume
 Garcinia latissima Miq.
 Garcinia lauterbachiana A.C.Sm.
 Garcinia ledermannii Lauterb.
 Garcinia leggeae W.E.Cooper
 Garcinia leptophylla Bittrich
 Garcinia letestui Pellegr.
 Garcinia linearifolia Elmer
 Garcinia linearis Pierre
 Garcinia linii C.E.Chang
 Garcinia livingstonei T.Anderson
 Garcinia loheri Merr.
 Garcinia longifolia Blume
 Garcinia longipedicellata Kosterm.
 Garcinia lowryi Z.S.Rogers & P.W.Sweeney
 Garcinia lucens Pierre
 Garcinia lucida Vesque
 Garcinia lujae De Wild.
 Garcinia luzoniensis Merr.

M
 Garcinia macgregorii Merr.
 Garcinia macrantha A.C.Sm.
 Garcinia macrophylla Mart.
 Garcinia madagascariensis (Planch. & Triana) Baill. ex
 Garcinia madruno (Kunth) Hammel
 Garcinia magnifolia (Pittier) Hammel
 Garcinia magnophylla (Cuatrec.) Hammel
 Garcinia maingayi Hook.f. ex T.Anderson
 Garcinia malaccensis Hook.f. ex T.Anderson
 Garcinia maluensis Lauterb.
 Garcinia mammeoides Kosterm.
 Garcinia mangorensis (R.Vig. & Humbert) P.W.Sweeney &
 Garcinia mangostana L.
 Garcinia mangostifera Kaneh. & Hatus.
 Garcinia mannii Oliv.
 Garcinia matsudae Kaneh.
 Garcinia mckeaniana Craib
 Garcinia megistophylla P.W.Sweeney & Z.S.Rogers
 Garcinia memecyloides Ridl.
 Garcinia merguensis Wight
 Garcinia mestonii F.M.Bailey
 Garcinia microcarpa Pierre
 Garcinia microphylla Merr.
 Garcinia microstigma Kurz
 Garcinia microtropidiiformis Kaneh. & Hatus.
 Garcinia minahassensis Pierre
 Garcinia mindanaensis Merr.
 Garcinia minimiflora Ridl.
 Garcinia minutiflora Ridl.
 Garcinia miquelii Pierre
 Garcinia moaensis (Bisse) Borhidi
 Garcinia monantha Ridl.
 Garcinia montana Ridl.
 Garcinia morella (Gaertn.) Desr.
 Garcinia moseleyana Pierre
 Garcinia moszkowskii Lauterb.
 Garcinia mottleyana Pierre
 Garcinia moulmeinensis Pierre ex Vesque
 Garcinia multibracteolata Merr.
 Garcinia multifida (H.Perrier) P.W.Sweeney & Z.S.Rogers
 Garcinia multiflora Champ. ex Benth.
 Garcinia mungotia Planch. ex Pierre
 Garcinia murdochii Ridl.
 Garcinia murtonii Whitmore
 Garcinia myristicifolia Pierre
 Garcinia myrtifolia A.C.Sm.

N
 Garcinia nervosa (Miq.) Miq.
 Garcinia nigricans Pierre
 Garcinia nigrolineata Planch. ex T.Anderson
 Garcinia nitida Pierre
 Garcinia novoguineensis Vesque
 Garcinia nubigena Lauterb.
 Garcinia nujiangensis C.Y.Wu & Y.H.Li
 Garcinia nuntasaenii Ngerns. & Suddee

O
 Garcinia obliqua Sosef & Dauby
 Garcinia oblongifolia Champ. ex Benth.
 Garcinia oligantha Merr.
 Garcinia oligophlebia Merr.
 Garcinia oliveri Pierre
 Garcinia ophiticola (Borhidi) Borhidi
 Garcinia oreophila Lauterb.
 Garcinia orthoclada Baker
 Garcinia ovalifolia Oliv.

P
 Garcinia pachyantha A.C.Sm.
 Garcinia pachycarpa (A.C.Sm.) Kosterm.
 Garcinia pachyclada N.Robson
 Garcinia pachypetala Lauterb.
 Garcinia pacifica Merr.
 Garcinia pallida Lauterb.
 Garcinia pallide-sanguinea Lauterb.
 Garcinia pancheri Pierre
 Garcinia parviflora Benth.
 Garcinia parvifolia (Miq.) Miq.
 Garcinia parvula (H.Perrier) P.W.Sweeney & Z.S.Rogers
 Garcinia pauciflora Baker
 Garcinia paucinervis Chun & F.C.How
 Garcinia pedicellata (G.Forst.) Seem.
 Garcinia pedunculata Roxb. ex Buch.-Ham.
 Garcinia penangiana Pierre
 Garcinia pervillei (Planch. & Triana) Vesque
 Garcinia petiolaris Pierre
 Garcinia picrorhiza Miq.
 Garcinia pictoria Buch.-Ham.
 Garcinia planchonii Pierre
 Garcinia platyphylla A.C.Sm.
 Garcinia plena Craib
 Garcinia poilanei Gagnep.
 Garcinia polyneura (Urb.) Borhidi
 Garcinia ponapensis Lauterb.
 Garcinia portoricensis (Urb.) Alain
 Garcinia prainiana King
 Garcinia preussii Engl.
 Garcinia pseudoguttifera Seem.
 Garcinia puat (Montrouz.) Guillaumin
 Garcinia pullei Lauterb.
 Garcinia pulvinata (Planch. & Triana) Hammel
 Garcinia punctata Oliv.
 Garcinia pungens Borhidi
 Garcinia pushpangadaniana T.Sabu, N.Mohanan, Krishnaraj & Shareef
 Garcinia pyrifera Ridl.

Q
 Garcinia quadrifaria (Oliv.) Baill. ex Pierre
 Garcinia quadrilocularis Seeth.
 Garcinia quaesita Pierre

R
 Garcinia ramosii Merr.
 Garcinia ramulosa Lauterb.
 Garcinia revoluta (Urb.) Borhidi
 Garcinia rheedei Pierre
 Garcinia rhizophoroides Elmer
 Garcinia rhynchophylla A.C.Sm.
 Garcinia rigida Miq.
 Garcinia riparia A.C.Sm.
 Garcinia robsoniana Bamps
 Garcinia rostrata (Hassk.) Miq.
 Garcinia rubra Merr.
 Garcinia rubriflora Boerl.
 Garcinia rubrisepala Y.H.Li
 Garcinia rubroechinata Kosterm.
 Garcinia rumiyo Kaneh.
 Garcinia rupestris Lauterb.
 Garcinia ruscifolia (Griseb.) Borhidi
 Garcinia russellii W.E.Cooper

S
 Garcinia sabangensis Lauterb.
 Garcinia salakensis Pierre
 Garcinia samarensis Merr.
 Garcinia sampitana Diels
 Garcinia sarawhensis Pierre
 Garcinia scaphopetala B.L.Burtt
 Garcinia schlecbteri Lauterb.
 Garcinia schomburgkiana Pierre
 Garcinia schraderi Lauterb.
 Garcinia scortechinii King
 Garcinia segmentata Kosterm.
 Garcinia semseii Verdc.
 Garcinia serpentini Borhidi
 Garcinia sessilis (G.Forst.) Seem.
 Garcinia sizygiifolia Pierre
 Garcinia smeathmanii (Planch. & Triana) Oliv.
 Garcinia smithii Kosterm.
 Garcinia solomonensis A.C.Sm.
 Garcinia sopsopia (Buch.-Ham.) Mabb.
 Garcinia spectabilis Pierre
 Garcinia spicata (Wight & Arn.) Hook.f.
 Garcinia squamata Lauterb.
 Garcinia staudtii Engl.
 Garcinia stigmacantha Pierre
 Garcinia stipulata T.Anderson
 Garcinia subelliptica Merr.
 Garcinia subfalcata Y.H.Li & F.N.Wei
 Garcinia subtilinervis F.Muell.
 Garcinia succifolia Kurz
 Garcinia sulphurea Elmer
 Garcinia sumbawensis Lauterb.

T
 Garcinia talbotii Raizada ex Santapau
 Garcinia tanzaniensis Verdc.
 Garcinia tauensis Lauterb.
 Garcinia terpnophylla Thwaites
 Garcinia tetralata C.Y.Wu ex Y.H.Li
 Garcinia tetrandra Pierre
 Garcinia teysmanniana Scheff.
 Garcinia thorelii Pierre
 Garcinia thouvenotii (H.Perrier) P.W.Sweeney & Z.S.Rogers
 Garcinia timorensis Zipp. ex Span.
 Garcinia tonkinensis Vesque
 Garcinia torensis Lauterb.
 Garcinia travancorica Bedd.
 Garcinia treubii Pierre
 Garcinia trianii Pierre
 Garcinia tsaratananae (H.Perrier) P.W.Sweeney & Z.S.Rogers
 Garcinia tsimatimia P.W.Sweeney & Z.S.Rogers
 Garcinia tuberculata Lauterb.

U
 Garcinia umbellulata Ridl.
 Garcinia umbonata Lauterb.
 Garcinia uniflora King
 Garcinia urophylla Scort. ex King
 Garcinia urschii (H.Perrier) P.W.Sweeney & Z.S.Rogers

V
 Garcinia valetoniana Lauterb.
 Garcinia venulosa (Blanco) Choisy
 Garcinia verrucosa Jum. & H.Perrier
 Garcinia versteegii Lauterb.
 Garcinia verticillata Alain
 Garcinia vidalii Merr.
 Garcinia vidua Ridl.
 Garcinia vieillardii Pierre
 Garcinia vilersiana Pierre
 Garcinia viridiflora Ridl.
 Garcinia vitiensis (A.Gray) Seem.
 Garcinia volkensii Engl.
 Garcinia vriesiana Pierre

W
 Garcinia warburgiana A.C.Sm.
 Garcinia warrenii F.Muell.
 Garcinia whitfordii Merr.
 Garcinia wichmannii Lauterb.
 Garcinia wightii T.Anderson
 Garcinia wollastonii Ridl.

X
 Garcinia xanthochymus Hook.f. ex T.Anderson
 Garcinia xipshuanbannaensis Y.H.Li
 Garcinia xylosperma Pierre

Y
 Garcinia yunnanensis Hu

Z
 Garcinia zeylanica Roxb.
 Garcinia zichii W.E.Cooper

References

L
Garcinia
Garcinia